Department of Cundinamarca  (Departamento de Cundinamarca) is one of the departments of Colombia. It was created on August 5, 1886, under the constitutional terms presented on the same year. Cundinamarca is located in the center of Colombia.

Cundinamarca's capital city is Bogotá, the capital of Colombia. This is a special case among Colombian departments, since Bogotá is not legally a part of Cundinamarca, yet it is the only department that has its capital designated by the Constitution (if the capital were to be ever moved, it would take a constitutional reform to do so, instead of a simple ordinance passed by the Cundinamarca Assembly). In censuses, the populations for Bogotá and Cundinamarca are tabulated separately; otherwise, Cundinamarca's population would total over 10 million.

 source: citypopulation.de

Etymology 
The name of Cundinamarca comes from Kuntur marqa, an indigenous expression, probably derived from Quechuan and means "condor's nest".

Geography 
Most of Cundinamarca is on the Eastern Cordillera (Cordillera Oriental), just south of Boyacá, bordered by the Magdalena River on the west, reaching down into the Orinoco River basin on the east, and bordering on Tolima to the south. The capital district of Bogotá is nearly completely surrounded by Cundinamarca territory and was formed by carving up Cundinamarca. Because of this and other border changes, the present department of Cundinamarca is much smaller than the original state.

Demography and ethnography

Municipalities with over 50,000 inhabitants

Municipal population position 
According to the latest census conducted in 2005, 2,280,037 people live in Cundinamarca, excluding 6,776,009 of the capital, Bogotá. The racial makeup is:
 Whites and mestizos (96.28%): Mestizos are mixed European-Amerindian blood. The Bogotá metropolitan area has a history of European (not limited to Spanish) and other Latin American immigration. 
 Blacks or Afro-Colombians (3.33-3.37%)
 Indigenous/Amerindians (0.31-0.34%)
 Roma (Gitanos or Gypsies) (0.01%)
 East Asians (0.01%), often of Chinese descent. About 25,000 Chinese-Colombians live in the department.
 
The city of Bogotá and the municipalities of Soacha, La Calera, Cota, Chía, Madrid, Funza, Mosquera, Fusagasugá, Facatativá and Zipaquirá form a single metropolitan area.

Important cities 
Cundinamarca is made up of 116 municipalities, six of which recorded a population of over 100,000 and could be considered as cities: Soacha, Fusagasugá, Girardot, Facatativá, Zipaquirá and Chia, while Bogotá District is in the category of capital.

 Metropolitan Area of Bogotá: Comprises the towns of Soacha, Facatativá, Chia, Madrid, Funza, and Mosquera, among others. Its activities are centered in the industrial sector. Estate activity is important especially in the suburbs closer to Bogotá: Chía, La Calera and Tocancipá.
 Girardot: In the far southwest and bordering Department of Tolima, is the capital of the Upper Magdalena Province. Its main economic activity is trade, as a result of a major tourist dynamics and its proximity to major agricultural areas of Tolima. It has a college and important trade fairs and events.
 Fusagasugá is located between Bogotá and Girardot, and it is an hour of each city. The capital city of the Province of Sumapaz, it is an important focus of agricultural marketing and regional services, standing out as an educational city with a large university and an increasing population trend. Its economy is mainly focused on trade and agricultural marketing, with a significant production of ornamental plants and flowers for export, for which it is known as the garden city of Colombia.
 Zipaquirá: Despite being part of the metropolitan area of Bogotá, it has managed to position itself as one of the most important centers of Colombia's salt mining industry. Its economy is focused on commerce and services.

Other major towns are Ubaté due to high livestock and dairy production. Guaduas, is an important cultural center. Chocontá and Fred are agricultural centers.

Provinces 

Cundinamarca has 15 provinces and the Capital District (Bogotá), which simultaneously acts as capital of the Republic, capital of the Department and a separately administered District (or Department) in itself.

 Almeidas
 Upper Magdalena (Alto Magdalena)
 Lower Magdalena (Bajo Magdalena)
 Gualivá
 Guavio
 Central Magdalena (Magdalena Centro)
 Medina
 Eastern (Oriente)
 Rionegro
 Central Savanna (Sabana Centro)
 Western Savanna (Sabana Occidente)
 Soacha
 Sumapaz
 Tequendama
 Ubaté

Tourism 
 Chingaza National Natural Park
 La Chorrera Falls, one of the tallest waterfalls in the world
 Cucunubá, wool capital of Colombia
 Lake Guatavita
 Salt Cathedral of Zipaquirá
 Sumapaz Páramo
 Tequendama Falls
 Tominé Reservoir

Sports 

The department is home to the basketball team Cóndores de Cundinamarca, which plays its home games in the Coliseo de la Luna in Chía.

See also 
 Altiplano Cundiboyacense
 Postage stamps and postal history of Cundinamarca

References

External links 

 

 
1857 establishments in the Republic of New Granada
Departments of Colombia
States and territories established in 1857